County Antrim Yacht Club is located in Whitehead, County Antrim, Northern Ireland on the north shore of Belfast Lough

The club is one of the clubs on the lough that form part of the Belfast Lough Yachting Conference

External links 
 County Antrim Yacht Club

Yacht clubs in Northern Ireland
Sports clubs in County Antrim